Kalvemellen is a mountain in Øystre Slidre Municipality in Innlandet county, Norway. The mountain is surrounded by several other notable mountains including Skarvemellen to the south, Rundemellen to the northwest, and Rabalsmellen to the north.

See also
List of mountains of Norway by height

References

Øystre Slidre
Mountains of Innlandet